Complexe OCP, or Stade du Phosphate, is a multi-use stadium in Khouribga, Morocco.  It is currently used mostly for football matches and hosts the home games of Olympique Khouribga. The stadium holds 10,000 people.

References

External links 
 Stadium pictures

Football venues in Morocco
Buildings and structures in Béni Mellal-Khénifra
Olympique Club de Khouribga